James Christian is an American musician and songwriter who is perhaps best known for being the frontman of the band House of Lords. He is married to Robin Beck. They married in 1996 and have a daughter named Olivia (born 1997).

Discography

Studio albums
Rude Awakening (1995) (reissued 1998) 
Meet the Man (2004)
Lay It All on Me (2013)
Craving (2018)

with Jasper Wrath
Zoldar & Clark (1977)
Anthology: 1969–1976 (1996)

with Eyes
We're in It Together (1978)

with House of Lords
 House of Lords (1988)
 Sahara (1990)
 Demons Down (1992)
 The Power and the Myth (2004)
 World Upside Down (2006)
 Come to My Kingdom (2008)
 Cartesian Dreams (2009)
 Big Money (2011)
 Precious Metal (2014)
 Indestructible (2015)
 Saint of the Lost Souls (2017)
 New World – New Eyes (2020)
 Saints & Sinners (2022)

Guest appearances
 Tim Feehan – Full Contact (1990)
 Lanny Cordola – Electric Warrior and Acoustic Saint (lead vocals "Shadows Over My Heart" and "Summertime") (1992)
 Magdallan – Big Bang (1992)
 Pata – Pata (1993)
 Impellitteri – Answer to the Master (1994)
 Robin Beck – Wonderland (2003) (Producer)
 Robin Beck – Livin' on a Dream (2007) (Co-producer)
 Voices of Rock MMVII (2007) (Lead vocal on Voodoo Woman) 
 Ranfa - "Little hard blues" (2007) Duet vocalist in track "Little hard blues"
 Moonstone Project – Rebel on the Run (2009) (Lead vocals on all but one track)
  Alias – Never Say Never (2009) (background vocals)
 Robin Beck – The Great Escape (2011) (Producer and duet vocalist Till The End Of Time)
 Fiona – Unbroken (2011) (Producer) 
 From Tom Galley The Creator of Phenomena - Awakening (2012) (Lead vocals on track 4)

References

External links
 James Christian's Official Website
 House of Lords - Indestructible EPK (Official / News / Studio Album / 2015)
 Interview with James Christian from House of Lords
 Rockeyez Interview W/ James Christian - House Of Lords
 James Christian Interview | House Of Lords
 Interview with James Christian (House Of Lords)

American people of Italian descent
American rock singers
American male singer-songwriters
American rock songwriters
Living people
House of Lords (band) members
Place of birth missing (living people)
Year of birth missing (living people)
Singer-songwriters from New York (state)
Christians from Connecticut
Frontiers Records artists
Singer-songwriters from Connecticut